Alan Bennett (5 November 1931 – 17 January 2006) was an English footballer who played on the left-wing. He made 133 league appearances in a nine-year career in the English Football League. He played for Port Vale between 1949 and 1957, and was a member of the Third Division North winning side in 1953–54. He retired in 1958, following one season with Crewe Alexandra.

Career

Port Vale
Bennett graduated from the Port Vale juniors to sign his first professional contract with the club in 1949. He made his senior debut on 26 March 1949, in a 2–0 defeat to Bournemouth & Boscombe Athletic at The Old Recreation Ground. He played ten Third Division South games for Gordon Hodgson's "Valiants" in 1949–50. He featured 31 times in 1950–51, and scored his first senior goal on 30 September, in a 2–1 home win over Swindon Town. Bennett scored three goals in 40 appearances in 1951–52, after retaining his first team place at Vale Park despite the transition of manager from Hodgson to Ivor Powell and then to Freddie Steele. He scored three goals in 29 games in 1952–53, as Vale went on to finish second in the Third Division North. He lost his first team place in December 1952, and featured only five times in 1953–54, as Vale won the league title and reached the semi-finals of the FA Cup. He played four Second Division games in 1954–55, and then featured seven times in 1955–56 and just twice in 1956–57. Having failed to revive his career under new manager Norman Low, Bennett was transferred to Maurice Lindley's Crewe Alexandra in September 1957.

Crewe Alexandra
The "Railwaymen" finished bottom of the English Football League in 1957–58, and Bennett then announced his retirement, aged just 27.

Style of play
A skilful and speedy winger, he required the protection of his teammates to prevent opposition hatchet men taking him out of the game.

Later life
After leaving the game, Bennett took up the greengrocer trade, later becoming a coal merchant.

Career statistics
Source:

Honours
Port Vale
Football League Third Division North: 1953–54

References

1931 births
2006 deaths
Sportspeople from Hanley, Staffordshire
English footballers
Association football wingers
Port Vale F.C. players
Crewe Alexandra F.C. players
English Football League players